Stenostephanus is a genus of plants in the family Acanthaceae.

Species
Species accepted by the Plants of the World Online as of January 2023:

Stenostephanus aglaus 
Stenostephanus alushii 
Stenostephanus ampelinus 
Stenostephanus anderssonii 
Stenostephanus antiquorum 
Stenostephanus asplundii 
Stenostephanus atrocalyx 
Stenostephanus atropurpureus 
Stenostephanus azureus 
Stenostephanus blepharorhachis 
Stenostephanus breedlovei 
Stenostephanus charien 
Stenostephanus charitopes 
Stenostephanus chavesii 
Stenostephanus chiapensis 
Stenostephanus citrinus 
Stenostephanus clarkii 
Stenostephanus cleefii 
Stenostephanus cochabambensis 
Stenostephanus crenulatus 
Stenostephanus cuatrecasasii 
Stenostephanus cuscoensis 
Stenostephanus cyaneus 
Stenostephanus davidsonii 
Stenostephanus densiflorus 
Stenostephanus diversicolor 
Stenostephanus enarthrocoma 
Stenostephanus florifer 
Stenostephanus glaber 
Stenostephanus gracilis 
Stenostephanus guerrerensis 
Stenostephanus haematodes 
Stenostephanus harleyi 
Stenostephanus hispidulus 
Stenostephanus holm-nielsenii 
Stenostephanus hondurensis 
Stenostephanus jamesonii 
Stenostephanus kirkbridei 
Stenostephanus krukoffii 
Stenostephanus lamprus 
Stenostephanus lasiostachyus 
Stenostephanus latifolius 
Stenostephanus latilabris 
Stenostephanus laxus 
Stenostephanus leiorhachis 
Stenostephanus leonardianus 
Stenostephanus lobeliiformis 
Stenostephanus longistaminus 
Stenostephanus lugonis 
Stenostephanus luteynii 
Stenostephanus lyman-smithii 
Stenostephanus macrochilus 
Stenostephanus macrolobus 
Stenostephanus madidiensis 
Stenostephanus madrensis 
Stenostephanus magdalenensis 
Stenostephanus maximus 
Stenostephanus monolophus 
Stenostephanus oaxacanus 
Stenostephanus pilosus 
Stenostephanus puberulus 
Stenostephanus purpusii 
Stenostephanus putumayensis 
Stenostephanus pycnostachys 
Stenostephanus pyramidalis 
Stenostephanus racemosus 
Stenostephanus reflexiflorus 
Stenostephanus ruberrimus 
Stenostephanus sanguineus 
Stenostephanus scolnikae 
Stenostephanus sehuencasii 
Stenostephanus sessilifolius 
Stenostephanus silvaticus 
Stenostephanus spicatus 
Stenostephanus sprucei 
Stenostephanus strictus 
Stenostephanus suburceolatus 
Stenostephanus syscius 
Stenostephanus tacanensis 
Stenostephanus tachirensis 
Stenostephanus tenellus 
Stenostephanus ventricosus 
Stenostephanus villosus 
Stenostephanus wallnoeferi 
Stenostephanus wasshausenii 
Stenostephanus wilburii 
Stenostephanus xanthothrix 
Stenostephanus zuliensis

References

 
Acanthaceae genera
Taxonomy articles created by Polbot